Wat Ratchabophit  is a khwaeng (subdistrict) in Phra Nakhon District, Bangkok.

Naming
The subdistrict is named after Wat Ratchabophit, a dominant Buddhist temple in the area. Built by King Chulalongkorn (Rama V) in 1869 and completed in 1870. This small, quiet but significant temple, its name means "The Temple Built by the King". It is another temple of the King Chulalongkorn besides Wat Benchamabophit (Marble Temple), also it is the temple of the King Prajadhipok (Rama VII) as well.

Geography
Wat Ratchabophit is considered to be the central part indented to the south of the district. Entire area is in the Rattanakosin Island (Bangkok's old town zone is entirely surrounded by waterway like island).

Adjoining areas are (from the north clockwise): San Chaopho Suea, Sao Chingcha (Bamrung Mueang Road is a boundary), Samran Rat (Siri Phong Road is a boundary), Wang Burapha Phirom (Khlong Lot Wat Ratchabophit is a boundary), and Phra Borom Maha Ratchawang (Khlong Khu Mueang Doem is a boundary).

Places
Wat Ratchabophit and the royal cemetery
Wat Suthat
Sao Chingcha (Giant Swing)
Ministry of Interior
Trok Mo Market

Gallery

References

Phra Nakhon district
Subdistricts of Bangkok